The Louisiana State Capitol is the seat of government for the U.S. state of Louisiana and is located in downtown Baton Rouge. The capitol houses the chambers for the Louisiana State Legislature, made up of the House of Representatives and the Senate, as well as the office of the Governor of Louisiana. It is located on a  tract, which includes the capitol gardens. The Louisiana State Capitol is often thought of as "Huey Long's monument" due to the influence of the former Governor and U.S. Senator in getting the capitol built. The building's construction was completed in 1931. It was listed on the National Register of Historic Places in 1978 and was designated a National Historic Landmark in 1982.

History 

In order to secure the mouth of the Mississippi River for the French, the town of New Orleans was founded in 1718 and became the capital for colony of Louisiana in 1722. In 1763, the Treaty of Paris ceded the portion of Louisiana that was west of the Mississippi River, as well as New Orleans, to Spain and the remaining territory east of the Mississippi was turned over to Great Britain. The French reclaimed Louisiana from the Spanish in 1803 after the Treaty of San Ildefonso in 1800; the territory was then sold as the Louisiana Purchase to the United States. The ceremonial transfers of Louisiana from Spain to France in November 1803 took place in front of the colonial seat of government, the Cabildo. The transfer from France to the U.S. occurred there as well less than a month later.

New Orleans continued to be the location of the capital of the Territory of Orleans, and through its admission into the U.S. as the state of Louisiana. The State Legislature passed a resolution declaring that the seat of government be moved to a "more convenient place" than New Orleans. No action was taken until 1829 when the Legislature voted to move to Donaldsonville. It convened for the first time in Donaldsonville in January 1830. On January 8, 1831, it became "dissatisfied with the quarters there", and adjourned shortly thereafter to return to New Orleans.

Old State Capitol 

Included in the Louisiana State Constitution of 1845 was a clause that required the state capital to be moved from New Orleans by 1849. A committee was formed to prepare a site for the eventual move and, the designs by James H. Dakin were chosen in a competition on May 5, 1847. The city of Baton Rouge donated a plot of land situated on a bluff overlooking the Mississippi River to the state on September 7 for the construction of the new capitol. Dakin's design for the capitol consisted of a "castellated" Gothic Revival building, a rarity for government buildings in the United States. The capitol was dedicated on December 1, 1849 in what was planned to be a grand ceremony.  However, a devastating fire in Baton Rouge a week prior saw the funds reallocated as aid for the victims, which was deemed a "more worthy cause". Despite the Old State Capitol being considered the best example of Gothic Revival architecture in the South, Mark Twain recounted from his time as a steamboat pilot that it was "pathetic" and likely the result of the "medieval romances" of Sir Walter Scott.

With the start of the Civil War in 1861, and the occupation of both New Orleans and Baton Rouge by the Union Army, the location of the state government was moved to Opelousas in 1862, and then to Shreveport in 1864. The portion of Louisiana that was occupied by Union troops was governed out of New Orleans. The vacant Old State Capitol was originally used as a prison by the Union Army and, then, as a garrison for its  colored troops. On December 28, 1862, it was gutted by an accidental fire. After the war, the state government returned to New Orleans and utilized a mechanics' institute as a meeting place until the state purchased an old hotel in 1875. The State Legislature appropriated money to rebuild the  Old State Capitol in 1880; William A. Freret was placed in charge of the reconstruction. Under Freret, the capitol's famous spiral staircase and stained glass dome were added, as well as a fourth floor. The State Legislature returned to Baton Rouge, after the completion of the renovations, on May 8, 1882.

Current State Capitol 

By the 1920s, the Old State Capitol was starting to show its age and proving to be too small for the expanding state government. Proposals were drawn up for a new building, but were never acted upon due to the lack of money and more important issues. In 1928, Huey Long was elected Governor of Louisiana as a populist candidate. Long seized upon the idea of using a new capitol as a way to symbolize the end of the "political domination of Louisiana's traditional social and economic elite" in the state. In January 1930, Long secured funds from the Board of Liquidation, enabling him to hire architects to design the new capitol and approached Leon C. Weiss with the proposal;  Weiss' architectural firm Weiss, Dreyfous and Seiferth was well known for its many public buildings it had designed in Louisiana. By using funds that he controlled to start the design work, Long prevented the State Legislature from stopping the construction of the capitol. The designs for the capitol consisted of a modern skyscraper, sited on the former campus of the Louisiana State University, and expected to cost $1 million. In a special session of the State Legislature in September 1930, a bond issue for the final cost of the new capitol—$5 million—was passed despite initial reluctance from some of the legislators

By November 1930, the designs for the building were finalized, and, on December 16, construction of the capitol was started. A spur from the nearby Yazoo and Mississippi Valley Railroad to the capitol was also built "to facilitate the delivery of the 2,500 carloads of necessary materials". Work on the building progressed rapidly due to the insistence by Long that it be completed under his governorship. Long, who had been elected to the United States Senate in 1930, delayed taking the oath of office until January 1932 to prevent a political adversary, Paul N. Cyr, from becoming governor. Despite being completed in little over a year, the State Capitol was not dedicated until May 16, 1932, during the inauguration of Governor Oscar K. Allen.

Upon its completion, Long claimed, "Only one building compares with [the Capitol] in architecture. That's St. Peter's Cathedral in Rome, Italy."

On September 8, 1935, Huey Long was assassinated in the State Capitol by Dr. Carl Weiss. Weiss, in turn, was gunned down shortly thereafter by members of the Louisiana State Police acting as Long's bodyguards. His alleged motivation for the attack was that his father-in-law, Judge Benjamin Pavy, was going to be gerrymandered out of office by Long. Long lingered for two days at the nearby Our Lady of the Lake Hospital before he died on September 10. His body lay in state at the State Capitol where approximately 100,000 people—some from as far away as Arkansas, Mississippi and Texas—paid their respects. On September 13, Long was interred on the grounds in front of the Capitol. In 1938, the State Legislature appropriated $50,000 to replace Long's original gravemarker, a simple tombstone, with a more monumental one; two years later, a marble pedestal surmounted by a bronze statue was erected. Stray bullets that were fired by Weiss hit some columns in the corridor. The bulletholes are still present directly outside of the governor's office.

On April 26, 1970, a bomb consisting of "twenty to  sticks of dynamite" was detonated in the Senate Chamber. The bomb was an apparent retaliation for the shootings of three African Americans by the police; a second bomb exploded at a Baton Rouge country club. A pencil remains embedded in the ceiling of the chamber from the force of the explosion. The Louisiana State Capitol was added to the National Register of Historic Places on June 9, 1972, and was designated a National Historic Landmark on December 12, 1982.

Exterior 

The inspiration to reject the traditional "rotunda-dome-and-wing" capitol when designing Louisiana's came from Nebraska. At the time, the Nebraska State Capitol, designed by Bertram Goodhue, was under construction and was the first that was a modern skyscraper instead of traditionally being modeled on the United States Capitol. Despite the inefficiencies of floor space in early skyscrapers due to the presence of elevator shafts, Huey Long insisted that his capitol be a tower. Currently, it is also the tallest building in Baton Rouge and the seventh tallest in Louisiana.

The Capitol's facade was constructed out of limestone from Alabama and is decorated with many sculptures and reliefs, and includes much of Louisiana's symbols and its history. A frieze designed by Ulric Ellerhusen runs along the top of the tower's base, at the fifth floor, depicting the actions of Louisianans in wartime and peace, from colonization to World War I. Between each pilaster on the outside of the House and Senate chambers is one of twenty-two square portraits of important persons in Louisiana history. The portraits were divided up among several New Orleans sculptors: Angela Gregory worked on eight, Albert Reiker on six, John Lachin and Rudolph Parducci jointly on six, and Juanita Gonzales completed two. 

The front doors to the Capitol are reached by a "monumental stairway" consisting of 49, Minnesota granite steps. Each step has engraved the name of a U.S. state in the order of its statehood; Alaska and Hawaii, which were admitted after the completion of the Capitol, are both on the last step along with the phrase "E pluribus unum". Flanking both sides of the stairs are free-standing, limestone sculptures by Lorado Taft entitled Pioneers and Patriots, respectively, memorializing both the early settlers and defenders of Louisiana. On either side of the front doors are reliefs designed by Adolph Alexander Weinman depicting allegorical scenes of government providing "protection and encouragement...to the welfare of its people." Contrasting with Weinmans's reliefs is Lee Lawrie's flatter architrave that frames the doors and portal; the architrave more closely resembles the style of ancient Egyptian reliefs.

The tower itself is relatively unadorned until the 21st floor, where the square tower starts to transition to an octagonal shape. Four allegorical busts representing Law, Science, Philosophy and Art are carved into the corners of the tower reaching from the 22nd to the 25th floor. The cupola, originally referred to as a "temple", is dominated by large windows on all four sides, each topped with a pediment. Four stone eagles act as flying buttresses from the top of the cupola to the beacon atop the tower. The State Capitol is topped with a  lantern "symbolizing the higher aspirations of Louisiana."

Gardens 

The Louisiana Capitol Garden comprises , the majority of which are laid out to the south and east of the capitol. The landscaping of the grounds was overseen by the capitol's architect Leon Weiss and was installed by Jungle Gardens on Avery Island. The gardens flora include azaleas, camellias and magnolias—the state flower of Louisiana. Many live oaks were also transported to Baton Rouge; a few oaks, which were already present and were incorporated into the gardens, are over 200 years old. The  of sidewalks in the grounds are all lined with boxwood hedges.

The south park is  square and is divided by two  sidewalks extending from the capitol parking lot to Boyd Avenue. In its center is an arrangement of cris-crossing walks where the remains of Huey Long are interred; marking the spot is a  monument, including the  bronze statue of Long, designed by Charles Keck. The grounds east of the capitol are less formal with "clusters of evergreens, palms, and small flower garden." The sidewalks east of the capitol end at the Old Arsenal, which has a  rose garden in front of it.

Interior 

The Louisiana State Capitol houses the chambers for the Louisiana House of Representatives, the Louisiana State Senate and, the office of the Governor of Louisiana and several other state offices. Huey Long had an apartment installed for his use on the 24th floor under the impression that the altitude would help alleviate his "hay fever". An observation deck, complete with a gift shop, is located on the 27th floor allowing views of Baton Rouge and the Mississippi River.

Memorial Hall 

The front entrance to the capitol opens directly into the four-story, rectangular Memorial Hall. Embedded in the floor, in the center of Memorial Hall, is a bronze plaque  in diameter and weighing . The plaque depicts a relief map of Louisiana showing parish boundaries and seats, industries and exports, and the flora and fauna of Louisiana. Mounted on the balcony over the elevator banks are the flags of the entities that have held dominion over Louisiana.

House and Senate Chambers 

The chambers for the Louisiana House of Representatives and State Senate, along with Memorial Hall, make up the majority of the capitol's broad base. The Louisiana House of Representatives and the Louisiana Senate meet here for 120 days during a regular session to make bills and either vote them into law or kill them.

In popular culture 

The 1975 television film The Deadly Tower, depicting the shootings at the University of Texas at Austin in 1966 by Charles Whitman, was filmed at the Louisiana State Capitol. The film was unable to use the actual tower in Austin. Instead, the capitol, which bore a similar appearance and whose grounds have a similar layout, was used.

The Louisiana State Capitol, especially the bronze plaque in Memorial Hall, is featured heavily in the 2006 film adaptation of Robert Penn Warren's novel All the King's Men. The novel itself was thought to be inspired by the life and assassination of Huey Long.

Featured in the opening scene pep rally of the 1988 film Everybody's All-American with the John Goodman character climbing up the Huey Long statue.

See also 

List of National Historic Landmarks in Louisiana
List of tallest buildings in Louisiana
List of tallest buildings in Baton Rouge
List of state and territorial capitols in the United States
National Register of Historic Places listings in East Baton Rouge Parish, Louisiana

Notes 

a. The 22 persons depicted in the portraits, beginning on the left side of the front of the Capitol and going counterclockwise, are: Edward Livingston, William C. C. Claiborne, Jean-Baptiste Le Moyne, René-Robert Cavelier, Hernando de Soto, Andrew Jackson, Henry Watkins Allen, Edward Douglass White, Thomas Jefferson, Judah P. Benjamin, Richard Taylor, Francis T. Nicholls, P. G. T. Beauregard, Zachary Taylor, John McDonogh, Julien de Lallande Poydras, Judah Touro, Paul Tulane, Louis Moreau Gottschalk, John James Audubon, and Charles Gayarré.
b. In chronological order, from right to left, are the flags of Castile and Léon, Bourbon France, Great Britain, Spain, the French Tricolour, a 15-star U.S. flag, the flags of the Republic of West Florida, Republic of Louisiana, Confederate States of America, the Confederate battle flag, the state of Louisiana, and, flanking either side, a modern U.S. flag.

References

Sources

External links 

 The Louisiana State Capitol Building
 National Register of Historic Places information 
 History of the building, from the Louisiana State Legislature

Art Deco architecture in Louisiana
Art Deco skyscrapers
Buildings and structures in Baton Rouge, Louisiana
Buildings with sculpture by Corrado Parducci
Government of Louisiana
Government buildings completed in 1932
Government buildings in Louisiana
History of Baton Rouge, Louisiana
National Historic Landmarks in Louisiana
Government buildings on the National Register of Historic Places in Louisiana
State capitols in the United States
Skyscrapers in Louisiana
Terminating vistas in the United States
Tourist attractions in Baton Rouge, Louisiana
National Register of Historic Places in Baton Rouge, Louisiana
Skyscraper office buildings in Louisiana
Assassination sites